The Alaska State Museum is a museum in Juneau, Alaska, United States. The museum's collections include cultural materials from the people of the Northwest Coast (Tlingit, Haida and Tsimshian), the Athabascan cultures of Interior Alaska, the Inupiaq of the north coast, and the Yup'ik of the southwest of Alaska, the Alutiiq people of Prince William Sound and Kodiak Island, and the Unangax from out along the Aleutian chain. Artifacts from the state's Russian colonial eras, state and political history, fine art (including contemporary art), natural history, industry and trades can also be found on exhibit.

After a $139 million renovation, it re-opened after a two-year and three-month closure. The museum closed temporarily on February 28, 2014, for the creation of a new facility that joined the State Libraries, Archives and Museum (SLAM) together in a comprehensive research facility. The old structure, designed by Linn A. Forrest, was demolished in August 2014, and a new facility opened on the same footprint (but larger), on June 6, 2016. The new building was named after the first curator for the Alaska State Museum, the Russian Orthodox priest, Father Andrew P. Kashevaroff. This building is also known as the APK.

References

External links
 

Alaska Native culture in Juneau
History museums in Alaska
Museums in Juneau, Alaska
Native American museums in Alaska
Museum